Dustin Columbus McDonald (October 3, 1908 – February 23, 1975) was a guard in the National Football League.

Biography
McDonald was born on October 3, 1908.

Career
McDonald was a member of the Green Bay Packers during the 1935 NFL season. He played at the collegiate level at Indiana University.

See also
List of Green Bay Packers players

References

1908 births
1975 deaths
Green Bay Packers players
American football offensive guards
Indiana Hoosiers football players
Players of American football from Arkansas
People from Heber Springs, Arkansas